The following radio stations broadcast on AM frequency 1188 kHz:

Bangladesh 
 Transfer CRI CGTN Radio in Dhaka (during 18:00-19:00 and 21:00-22:00)

India 
 Transfer CRI CGTN Radio in Delhi (during 17:30-18:30 and 20:30-21:30) and Kathmantu (during 17:45-18:45)

Iran
 Radio Payam in Tehran.

Italy
"Radio Studio X" at Pistoia, Tuscany (transmits AM stereo)

Sri Lanka 
 Transfer CRI CGTN Radio in Colombo (during 20:30-21:30)

References

Lists of radio stations by frequency